Syed Nayeemuddin (born 1944), known as Nayeem, is an Indian football coach and former player. He played for and was captain of the India national team and has managed Mahindra United, Brothers Union, Dhaka Mohammedan, and Bangladesh national team. He is the only sportsperson to win both the Arjuna Award, recognising his contribution to Indian football (received the award by the Government of India in 1997) and Dronacharya Award for football.

Playing career
Nayeemuddin began his club football career in 1962 with Hyderabad City Police, which was then a renowned side in Indian club football. In an interview to Scroll.in, Balai Dey (one of few footballers represented both India and Pakistan in international football) said that he was most impressed by players like Chuni Goswami and Syed Nayeemuddin during his playing days with Kolkata clubs. In 1968, he joined Mohun Bagan and played under "diamond coach" Amal Dutta, and won the 1969 IFA Shield with a 3–1 victory against East Bengal in the final. Nayeemuddin later joined Mohun Bagan and was part of the team that went to newly independent Bangladesh in May 1972, where they defeated Dhaka Mohammedan in their first match, but lost to Shadhin Bangla football team later.

He made his senior international debut for Syed Abdul Rahim managed India in 1964. In that year, he was part of the Indian team that finished as runners-up at the 1964 AFC Asian Cup, losing to Israel. He captained the India national team that won a bronze medal at the 1970 Asian Games in Bangkok, and was also a member of the team that won Pesta Sukan Cup in 1971 in Singapore. With India, he also appeared in 1968 Merdeka Cup under coaching of Sailen Manna, and in 1969 Merdeka Cup managed by Jarnail Singh.

Nayeemuddin represented Bengal in Santosh Trophy in 1970–71, in which they were eliminated from semi-final after defeat to Punjab.

Managerial career

After managing Mohammedan Sporting from 1982 to 1985, Nayeemuddin was appointed head coach of India U17 team and guided the team in 1985 AFC U-16 Championship qualifiers. They failed to qualify the main round but managed to win 13–0 against Macau, which is still the biggest win of India. In 1987, Nayeemuddin became assistant coach of Amal Dutta managed India, and guided the team clinching gold medal at the Calcutta South Asian Games. The next year, he became head coach and Dutta became technical director.

In 1990, he was appointed as head coach of East Bengal. In his first season, he led the club to their second Triple-crown of Indian football (IFA Shield, Durand Cup, and Rovers Cup). He helped East Bengal winning six trophies in two seasons in his first stint with the club. He was again appointed as the head coach in 1994 when he again led the team to seven trophies in two seasons. He had one more stint as the head coach in 2000 and holds the record of winning eighteen trophies as the head coach of the club, only second to P. K. Banerjee. In East Bengal, he nurtured Indian talents including Babu Mani, Bikash Panji, Krishanu Dey, and transformed Bhaichung Bhutia from a midfielder to striker.

From 1992 to 1994, he managed Mohun Bagan. The club defended their Rovers Cup title and won Federation Cup in 1992. Under his coaching, Mohun Bagan defeated Croatian First Football League club Varteks in 1994 DCM Trophy. At that time, his team participated in 1993–94 Asian Club Championship, won against Maldivian side Club Valencia and Sri Lankan club Ratnam in preliminary stages, but lost 4–0 to Thai Farmers' Bank in the first leg of second round, and refused to play the 2nd leg in Malaysia.

Nayeemuddin was appointed coach of India national team in 1997. He won the South Asian Football Federation Cup by beating the Maldives 5–1 and reached the semi-finals of the Nehru Cup for the first time. His time in charge of the national team was blighted with no practice matches between September 1997 and November 1998 before the 1998 Asian Games. He managed the team in 1998 Asian Games held at Bangkok, where they reached second round.

His tenure with India ended after the games in December 1998. Nayeemuddin in 1999, guided Mohun Bagan at the 1999–2000 Asian Club Championship. His second role with India began when he succeeded Sukhwinder Singh as India coach in 2005, but left in 2006 after poor performances against Japan and Yemen when qualifying for the 2007 Asian Cup. He helped Bangladeshi club Brothers Union winning their first ever Premier Division League title during the 2003–04 season and after coaching in India for a couple of years, he returned to Brothers Union, where he remained from 2007 to 2016. He has previously managed Bengal Mumbai in the Mumbai Football League.

In July 2007, he was appointed as head coach of Bangladesh ahead of the 2008 SAFF Championship in Malé and Colombo. He stayed at the post until 2008.

Nayeemuddin last managed Dhaka Mohammedan, a Bangladeshi club, from May to October 2017.

In April 2022 on the occasion of Dawat-e-Iftar, Nayeemuddin was awarded the Shaan-e-Mohammedan by Mohammedan Sporting, which is the lifetime achievement award presented by the club annually since 2015, to respect and laud footballing personalities for their indispensable contribution to the club during their career.

Honours

Player

India
AFC Asian Cup runner-up: 1964
Asian Games Bronze Medal: 1970
Merdeka Tournament runner-up: 1964; third-place: 1966, 1970
Pesta Sukan Cup (Singapore): 1971

Hyderabad City Police
Durand Cup runner-up: 1963
Rovers Cup: 1962, 1963–64.
DCM Trophy: 1965; runner-up 1964.

East Bengal
 IFA Shield: 1966, 1970
 Rovers Cup: 1967
 Calcutta Football League: 1966, 1970
 Durand Cup: 1967, 1970

Mohun Bagan
 IFA Shield: 1969
 Rovers Cup: 1968, 1970
 Calcutta Football League: 1969

Mohammedan Sporting
 IFA Shield: 1971
 Sait Nagjee Trophy: 1971
 Independence Day Cup: 1971, 1972
 Calcutta Football League runner-up: 1971
 Bordoloi Trophy runner-up: 1971

Manager

India
SAFF Championship: 1997, 2005

Mahindra United
Indian Federation Cup: 2005
East Bengal
Calcutta Football League: 1991, 1995, 2000
IFA Shield: 1990, 1991, 1994,  1995, 2000
Durand Cup: 1990, 1991, 1995
Rovers Cup: 1990, 1994

Brothers Union
Premier Division League (Dhaka): 2003–04
National Championship: 2004

Individual
 Arjuna Award: 1970
 Mohun Bagan Ratna: 2016
 Shaan-e-Mohammedan: 2022

See also
 List of National Sports Award recipients in Olympic sports
 List of India national football team captains
 List of India national football team managers
 List of East Bengal Club coaches
 History of the India national football team

References

Bibliography

External links

Syed Nayeemuddin profile and biography at The Mohun Bagan AC

Living people
Footballers from Hyderabad, India
Indian Muslims
Indian footballers
India international footballers
Indian football managers
India national football team managers
Bangladesh national football team managers
Expatriate football managers in Bangladesh
1964 AFC Asian Cup players
Asian Games medalists in football
Footballers at the 1966 Asian Games
Footballers at the 1970 Asian Games
1944 births
Asian Games bronze medalists for India
Association football defenders
Medalists at the 1970 Asian Games
Calcutta Football League players
Recipients of the Arjuna Award
Recipients of the Dronacharya Award
East Bengal Club managers
Mohammedan SC (Kolkata) managers
Indian expatriate football managers